The ORNL DAAC (Oak Ridge National Laboratory Distributed Active Archive Center) for Biogeochemical Dynamics is a National Aeronautics and Space Administration (NASA) Earth Observing System Data and Information System (EOSDIS) data center managed by the Earth Science Data and Information System (ESDIS) Project. Established in 1993, the ORNL DAAC is operated by Oak Ridge National Laboratory in Oak Ridge, Tennessee, under an interagency agreement between NASA and the Department of Energy (DOE). Within the ORNL, the ORNL DAAC is part of the Remote Sensing and Environmental Informatics Group of the Environmental Sciences Division (ESD) and a contributor to the Climate Change Science Institute (CCSI).

EOSDIS data centers process, archive, and distribute data collected during Earth Observing System (EOS) satellite and field  missions. They also develop tools for accessing data, provide user services, promote data usage, and collect metrics on the use of data and user satisfaction. The ORNL DAAC specializes on data and information relevant to terrestrial biogeochemistry, ecology, and environmental processes, which are critical to understanding the dynamics of Earth's biological, geological, and chemical components.

As provided on the website,

The ORNL DAAC is listed in the Registry of Research Data Repositories and is a Regular Member of the ISC World Data System.

See also 
Distributed Active Archive Center
Earth Observing System
Oak Ridge National Laboratory

References

External links 
 

NASA online
Earth sciences